P. linearis may refer to:
 Palafoxia linearis, a plant species in the genus Palafoxia
 Persoonia linearis, a shrub species in the genus Persoonia
 Petalonyx linearis, the narrowleaf sandpaper plant, a flowering plant species native to the deserts of eastern California, western Arizona and northwestern Mexico
 Petrophile linearis, the Pixie mops, a shrub species endemic to Western Australia
 Phacelia linearis, the linear-leaf scorpion-weed, a plant species in the genus Phacelia native to Canada
 Philotheca linearis (A.Cunn. ex Endl.) Paul G.Wilson, a plant species in the genus Philotheca
 Phlegethontia linearis, an extinct amphibian species from the Carboniferous and Permian periods of Europe and North America
 Prasiola linearis, an algae species in the genus Prasiola
 Pseudopanax linearis, a plant species in the genus Pseudopanax
 Pleurothallis linearis, a plant species in the genus Pleurothallis native to Mexico
 Pteris linearis, Poir., a fern species in the genus Pteris

Synonyms
 Phlomis linearis, a synonym for Phlomis armeniaca, a plant species
 Puccinia linearis, a synonym for Puccinia graminis, the stem rust, a cereal fungal disease

See also
 Linearis